Kocabey can refer to the following villages in Turkey:

 Kocabey, Şavşat
 Kocabey, Sındırgı